Homosaces is a genus of moths in the family Cosmopterigidae.

Species
Homosaces anthocoma Meyrick, 1894
Homosaces arvalis Meyrick, 1910
Homosaces nyctiphronas Meyrick, 1931
Homosaces pelochares Meyrick, 1934
Homosaces podarga Meyrick, 1914
Homosaces sanctificata Meyrick, 1936

References
Natural History Museum Lepidoptera genus database

Cosmopterigidae